The 1864 Maryland gubernatorial election took place on November 8, 1864. Incumbent Union Party Governor Augustus Bradford did not run for re-election. Union Party candidate Thomas Swann defeated Democratic candidate Ezekiel F. Chambers.

The Union Party was a faction of the Maryland Democratic Party which supported the Lincoln administration. The party supported the re-election of Abraham Lincoln under the banner of the National Union Party.

Swann took his oath of office on January 11, 1865, but by a provision of the 1864 State Constitution, he did not actually become Governor until January 10, 1866.

Results

Notes

References

Gubernatorial
1864
Maryland